Danica Galonić Fujimori is a Serbian-American chemical biologist who is a professor at the University of California, San Francisco. Her research considers nucleic acid synthesis and tissue engineering. In the search for new therapeutics and vaccines, she has studied the interactions between ribosomes and SARS-CoV-2.

Early life and education 
Galonić Fujimori earned her undergraduate degree at the University of Belgrade. She moved to the University of Illinois Urbana-Champaign for her doctoral research, where she earned a PhD in biochemistry. Her research considered the development of two strategies for site-selective peptide modification. She then moved to the Harvard Medical School where she worked alongside Christopher A. Walsh.

Research and career 
Galonić Fujimori has studied various biological processes, including chromatin formation, transcriptional regulation and DNA repair. Methylation impacts the regulation of biological processes, and the deregulation of methylation is associated with various diseases. As such, understanding and exploiting enzymatic regulation of methylation could provide an opportunity for therapeutic intervention. She has studied Jumonji domain-containing histone-lysine demethylases, complex proteins which catalyze the removal of methylation marks on the lysine residues of multiple histones can contain chromatin reader domains. These reader domains interact with chromatin, an interaction which is modulated by chromatin modifications. To probe the cellular function of the Jumonji family, the Galonić Fujimori laboratory develop small molecule inhibitors. She proposes that these molecules can be used to inhibit the aberrant demethylation that occurs in certain diseases. She has investigated the methylation of RNA, and how this impacts the cellular function of RNA.

Fujimori investigates how bacteria acquire immune responses to antibiotics. She has focused her efforts on antibiotics that target the ribosome of bacteria, which is involved with protein syntehsis. Antibiotics such as linezolid bind to sites such as the peptidyl transferase center, blocking protein biosynthesis.

During the COVID-19 pandemic, Galonić Fujimori started working on virus-host interactions in response to SARS-CoV-2. She showed that bromodomain and extraterminal (BET) proteins were involved in the body's response to COVID-19 infection. She started working on pharmaceuticals to tackle future pandemics.

Awards and honors 
 2011 National Science Foundation CAREER Award
 2015 University of California, San Francisco Haile T. Debas Academy of Medical Educators Excellence in Teaching Award
 2015 University of California, Berkeley Sackler Sabbatical Exchange Program
 2017 University of California, San Francisco Byers Award Lecture in Basic Sciences
 2020 Keck Foundation WM Keck Medical Research Award 
 2020 Bowes Biomedical Investigator Award

Selected publications

References 

Year of birth missing (living people)
Place of birth missing (living people)
University of California, San Francisco faculty
Harvard Medical School people
University of Belgrade alumni
University of Illinois Urbana-Champaign alumni
21st-century American biochemists
Serbian emigrants to the United States
Women biochemists
21st-century American women scientists
Living people